Hari Parajuli is a member of Communist Party of Nepal (Unified Socialist), was the Minister of Agricultural Development of Nepal from 25 February 2014 to 2 July 2015 under Sushil Koirala-led government.

Resignation
Parajuli tendered his resignation to Party President K.P. Oli and the Prime Minister Sushil Koirala on 2 July 2015 following the criticism made via media over his alleged indecent behavior with women while participating in paddy plantation in Mulpani at a function of National paddy day on 1 July 2015. Prime Minister Koirala approved his resignation according to the article 38(8) of the Nepal's Interim Constitution, 2007.

References

Year of birth missing (living people)
Living people
Communist Party of Nepal (Unified Socialist) politicians
Government ministers of Nepal